Alexandra Beaton (born ) is a Canadian actress. She is known for starring as Emily on the Canadian teen drama series The Next Step during its first seven seasons.

Early life
Beaton grew up near Claremont, Ontario. Beaton also has a younger sister, Sophie. She has stated that ever since a young age, she "knew" she wanted to be a performer, and began ballet classes at the age of two, and acting at five years old. Beaton studied political science at the University of Guelph, and noted that the course made her "think more critically".

Career
Beaton made her professional acting debut in the 2006 film 300, and subsequently appeared in various television advertisements. In 2013, Beaton was cast in the Family Channel series The Next Step as Emily. Beaton has described Emily as a "a bit of a mean girl", and noted Emily is "more confrontational" than herself in real life. Beaton was the only cast member with extensive acting experience prior to appearing in the series, and she has stated that she prefers acting scenes to dancing scenes on the series. In 2017, Beaton starred as Emma in a web series Spiral, alongside The Next Step co-star Brennan Clost. In 2019, she starred as Cassie in the Lifetime television film The Cheerleader Escort. In 2022, Beaton starred as one of the cheerleaders in the Syfy horror film Bring It On: Cheer or Die, the seventh installment in the ''Bring It On film series.

Filmography

References

External links
 

Date of birth missing (living people)
21st-century Canadian actresses
21st-century Canadian dancers
Actresses from Toronto
Canadian child actresses
Canadian female dancers
Canadian film actresses
Canadian political scientists
Canadian television actresses
Living people
University of Guelph alumni
Year of birth missing (living people)